The Azerbaijan women's national volleyball team is formed by the Azerbaijan Volleyball Federation (AVF) and represents Azerbaijan in international CEV and FIVB tournaments.

Competitive record

World Championship
 Champions   Runners-up   Third place   Fourth place

European Championship
 Champions   Runners-up   Third place   Fourth place

European Games
 Champions   Runners-up   Third place   Fourth place

European League
 Champions   Runners-up   Third place   Fourth place

Team

Current squad
The following is the Azerbaijani roster for the 2023 Women's European Volleyball Championship qualification.

Head coach: Eldar Yusubov

Records

Rankings
Azerbaijan achieved its highest position in the FIVB Senior World Rankings in 2019 when it was ranked as #22 in the world. National team had its lowest ranking as #44 in the world with 94 points on 8 August 2022.

Managers

Captains

Notable former players
 Alla Hasanova (1992-2005)
 Yelena Shabovta (1994-2006)
 Oksana Kurt (1998-2015)
 Valeriya Mammadova (2002-2017)
 Yelena Parkhomenko (2003-2016)
 Inessa Korkmaz (2004-2009)
 Oksana Mammadyarova (2004-2011)
 Kseniya Koçyiğit (2004-2017)
 Natalya Mammadova (2004-2018)
 Aynur Imanova (2006-2018, 2022-present)
 Polina Rahimova (2007-2020)
 Odina Bayramova (2014-2019, 2022-present)

References

External links
Official website
Archived website
FIVB profile

National women's volleyball teams
Volleyball in Azerbaijan
Volleyball